The Strange Case of Clara Deane is a 1932 American pre-Code drama film directed by Louis J. Gasnier and Max Marcin, written by Max Marcin, and starring Wynne Gibson, Pat O'Brien, Dudley Digges, Frances Dee, George Barbier, Russell Gleason and Lee Kohlmar. It was released on May 6, 1932, by Paramount Pictures.

Plot

A young dress designer marries an insurance agent. They soon have a daughter, But what the wife doesn't know is that her husband is actually a criminal, who soon involves her—unwittingly—in robbery. Sentenced to prison, she gives up her baby for adoption. When she is released 15 years later, she set out to find her long-lost daughter. A police inspector get involved in her search and, for reasons of his own, tries to dissuade her from finding her child.

Cast
Wynne Gibson as Clara Deane
Pat O'Brien as Frank Deane
Dudley Digges as Detective Garrison
Frances Dee as Nancy Deane
George Barbier as Richard Ware
Russell Gleason as Norman Ware
Lee Kohlmar as Moses Herzman
Cora Sue Collins as Nancy Deane
Florence Britton as Miriam Ware

References

External links
 

1932 films
American drama films
1932 drama films
Paramount Pictures films
Films directed by Louis J. Gasnier
American black-and-white films
1930s English-language films
1930s American films